Mirnoye is a rural locality (a hamlet) in Turukhansky District in Krasnoyarsk Krai, Russia. This small human settlement is a part of Turukhansky Municipal District.

This place, whose name means 'peaceful' in the Russian language, is mentioned in the literary works of Russian writer Mikhail Tarkovsky and in the novel The Woman Who Waited by Andreï Makine.

Arctic research station
The Yenisei Ecological Station, an Arctic research station, is located in the area of Mirnoye.

See also
List of research stations in the Arctic

References

Rural localities in Turukhansky District